Most local governments in the United States impose a property tax, also known as a millage rate, as a principal source of revenue.  This tax may be imposed on real estate or personal property. The tax is nearly always computed as the fair market value of the property times an assessment ratio times a tax rate, and is generally an obligation of the owner of the property. Values are determined by local officials, and may be disputed by property owners. For the taxing authority, one advantage of the property tax over the sales tax or income tax is that the revenue always equals the tax levy, unlike the other taxes. The property tax typically produces the required revenue for municipalities' tax levies. A disadvantage to the taxpayer is that the tax liability is fixed, while the taxpayer's income is not.

The tax is administered at the local government level. Many states impose limits on how local jurisdictions may tax property. Because many properties are subject to tax by more than one local jurisdiction, some states provide a method by which values are made uniform among such jurisdictions.

Property tax is rarely self-computed by the owner. The tax becomes a legally enforceable obligation attaching to the property at a specific date. Most states impose taxes resembling property tax in the state, and some states tax other types of business property.

Basics

Most jurisdictions below the state level in the United States impose a tax on interests in real property (land, buildings, and permanent improvements) that are considered under state law to be ownership interests. Rules vary widely by jurisdiction. However, certain features are nearly universal. Some jurisdictions also tax some types of business personal property, particularly inventory and equipment. States generally do not impose property taxes.

Many overlapping jurisdictions may have authority to tax the same property.  These include counties or parishes, cities and/or towns, school districts, utility districts, and special taxing authorities which vary by state. Few states impose a tax on the value of property. The tax is based on fair market value of the subject property, and generally attaches to the property on a specific date. The owner of the property on that date is liable for the tax.

The amount of tax is determined annually based on market value of each property on a particular date, and most jurisdictions require redeterminations of value periodically. The tax is computed as the determined market value times an assessment ratio times the tax rate. Assessment ratios and tax rates vary among jurisdictions, and may vary by type of property within a jurisdiction.  Most jurisdictions' legislative bodies determine their assessment ratios and tax rates, though some states impose constraints on such determinations.

Tax assessors for taxing jurisdictions determine property values in a variety of ways, but are generally required to base such determinations on fair market value.  Fair market value is that price for a willing and informed seller would sell the property to a willing and informed buyer, neither being under any compulsion to act. Where a property has recently been sold between unrelated sellers, such sale establishes fair market value.  In other (i.e., most) cases, the value must be estimated. Common estimation techniques include the comparable sales method, the depreciated cost method, and an income method approach. Property owners may also declare a value, which is subject to change by the tax assessor.

Once the value is determined, the assessor typically notifies the last known property owner of the value determination. Such notices may include the calculated amount of tax. The property owner may then contest the value. Property values are generally subject to review by a board of review or similar body, before which a property owner may contest determinations.

After values are settled, property tax bills or notices are sent to property owners. Payment times and terms vary widely. If a property owner fails to pay the tax, the taxing jurisdiction has various remedies for collection, in many cases including seizure and sale of the property.  Property taxes constitute a lien on the property to which transferees are also subject.

Property subject to tax 
Nearly all property tax imposing jurisdictions tax real property.  This includes land, buildings, and all improvements (often called fixtures) that cannot be removed without damage to the property.  Taxed property includes homes, farms, business premises, and most other real property.  Many jurisdictions also tax certain types of other property used in a business.  Property existing and located in the jurisdiction on a particular date is subject to this tax.  This date is often January 1 of each year, but varies among jurisdictions.
Property owned by educational, charitable, and religious organizations is usually exempt.

Tax rates 
Tax rates vary widely among jurisdictions.  They are generally set by the taxing jurisdiction's governing body.  The method of determining the rate varies widely, but may be constrained under laws of particular states. Property tax is likely the first or second highest tax burden on a capital-intensive business so hundreds of thousands of dollars may be at stake. In some jurisdictions, property is taxed based on its classification. Classification is the grouping of properties based on similar use.  Examples of classification are residential, commercial, industrial, vacant, and blighted real property. Property classification are used to tax properties at different rates and for different public policy purposes. In Washington D.C. for instance property occupancy is incentivized by taxing residential property at 0.85 percent of assessed value but vacant residential property at 5 percent of assessed value.

Rate or millage 
The rate of tax is a percentage of the assessed value of the property subject to tax.  This in some cases is expressed as a "millage" or dollars of tax per thousand dollars of assessed value.

Assessment ratio 
Most jurisdictions impose the tax on some stated portion of fair market value, referred to as an assessment ratio.  This ratio may vary depending on the type or use of the property.  The assessment ratio can, in many jurisdictions, be changed from year to year by the taxing jurisdiction's governing body. Changes in tax rate or assessment ratio may have the same practical effect of changing net tax due on a particular property.

Valuation 

Determining the value of property is a critical aspect of property taxation, as such value determines the amount of tax due.  Various techniques may be used to determine value.  Except in the case of property recently sold, valuation has some inherently subjective aspects.  Values may change over time, and many states require taxing jurisdictions to redetermine values every three or four years.  The value of property is often determined based on current use of the property, rather than potential uses.  Property values are determined at a particular valuation date for each jurisdiction, which varies widely.

Who determines value 
Property owners may make a declaration of the value of property they own to a taxing authority.  This is often referred to as rendition.  The taxing authority may accept this value or make its own determination of value.  The value determinations are generally made by a tax assessor for the taxing authority.  Some states require uniform values to be determined for each particular property.

Market value 
Property values are generally based on fair market value of the property on the valuation date.  Fair market value has been defined as that price a willing and informed purchaser would pay to an unrelated willing and informed seller where neither party is under compulsion to act.  Sale of the particular property between unrelated persons generally conclusively establishes fair market value on the date of sale.  Thus, a recent sale of the same property provides good evidence of market value.  Where there has been no recent sale, other techniques must be used to determine market value.

Assessed value 
Many jurisdictions impose tax on a value that is only a portion of market value.  This assessed value is the market value times an assessment ratio.  Assessment ratios are often set by local taxing jurisdictions.  However, some states impose constraints on the assessment ratios used by taxing jurisdictions within the state.  Some such restrictions vary by type or use of property, and may vary by jurisdiction within the state.  Some states impose restrictions on the rate at which assessed value may increase.

Equalization among jurisdictions 

Many states require that multiple jurisdictions taxing the same property must use the same market value.  Generally, such state provides a board of equalization or similar body to determine values in cases of disputes between jurisdictions.

Valuation techniques 
Tax assessors may use a variety of techniques for determining the value of property that was not recently sold.  Determining which technique to use and how to apply it inherently involves judgment.

Comparable sales 
Values may be determined based on recent sales of comparable property.  The value of most homes is usually determined based on sales of comparable homes in the immediate area.  Valuation adjustments may be necessary to achieve comparability.  Among the factors considered in determining if a property is comparable are:
 Nature of the property (house, office building, bare land, etc.)
 Location
 Size
 Use of the property (residential, commercial, farm, etc.)
 Nature of improvements
 Types and uses of buildings
 Features of the buildings (number of bedrooms, level of amenities, etc.)
 Age of improvements
 Desirability of the property (view, proximity to schools, type of access, nearby detracting features, etc.)
 Restrictions on the property (easements, building code restrictions, physical restrictions, etc.)
 Utility of the property (fertility of land, drainage or lack thereof, environmental issues, etc.)
 General economic conditions

Cost 
Where recent comparable property sales are not available, a cost based approach may be used.  In this approach, the original or replacement cost of a property is reduced by an allowance for decline in value (depreciation) of improvements.  In some jurisdictions, the amount of depreciation may be limited by statute.  Where original cost is used, it may be adjusted for inflation or increases or decreases in cost of constructing improvements.  Replacement cost may be determined by estimates of construction costs.

Income 
An alternative valuation may be used for income producing property based on economic concepts.  Using the income approach, value is determined based on present values expected income streams from the property.  Selection of an appropriate discount rate in determining present values is a key judgmental factor influencing valuation under this approach.

Special use values 
Most taxing jurisdictions provide that property used in any of several manners is subject to special valuation procedures.  This is commonly applied to property used for farming, forestry, or other uses common in the jurisdiction.  Some jurisdictions value property at its "highest and best use", with some of these providing exceptions for homes or agricultural land.  Special valuation issues vary widely among jurisdictions.

Revaluation 
All taxing jurisdictions recognize that values of property may change over time.  Thus, values must be redetermined periodically.  Many states and localities require that the value of property be redetermined at three or four year intervals.  Such revaluation may follow valuation principles above, or may use mass valuation techniques.

Limits on increases 
Some jurisdictions have set limits on how much property values may be increased from year to year for property tax purposes.  These limits may be applied yearly or cumulatively, depending on the jurisdiction's rules.

Assessment process 
The assessment process varies widely by jurisdiction as to procedure and timing.  In many states, the process of assessment and collection may be viewed as a two-year process, where values are determined in the first year and tax assessed and paid in the second.  Most jurisdictions encourage property owners to declare the value of their property at the start of the assessment process.  Property owners in all jurisdictions are given rights to appeal taxing authority determinations, but such rights vary widely.

Valuation by assessor 
Jurisdictions imposing property tax uniformly charge some official with determining value of property subject to tax by the jurisdiction.  This official may be an employee or contractor to the taxing government, and is generally referred to as the tax assessor in most jurisdictions.  Some taxing jurisdictions may share a common tax assessor for some or all property within the jurisdictions, especially when the jurisdictions overlap.

Notification to owner 
Following determination of value, tax assessors are generally required to notify the property owner(s) of the value so determined. Procedures vary by jurisdiction. In Louisiana, no formal notice is required; instead, the assessor "opens" the books to allow property owners to view the valuations. Texas and some other jurisdictions also require that the notice include very specific items, and such notice may cover multiple taxing jurisdictions.  Some jurisdictions provide that notification is made by publishing a list of properties and values in a local newspaper.

In some jurisdictions, such notification is required only if the value increases by more than a certain percentage.  In some jurisdictions, the notification of value may also constitute a tax bill or assessment.  Generally, notification of the owner starts the limited period during which the owner may contest the value.

Review 
Owners of property are nearly always entitled to discuss valuations with the tax assessor, and such discussions may result in changes in the assessor's valuation.  Many jurisdictions provide for a review of value determinations.  Such review is often done by a board of review, often composed of residents of the jurisdiction who are not otherwise associated with the jurisdiction's government.  In addition, some jurisdictions and some states provide for additional review bodies.

Protest 
Nearly all jurisdiction provide for a mechanism for contesting the assessor's determination of value.  Such mechanisms vary widely.

Judicial appeal 
All jurisdictions levying property tax must allow property owners to go to court to contest valuation and taxes.  Procedures for such judicial appeal vary widely.  Some jurisdictions prohibit judicial appeal until administrative appeals are exhausted.  Some permit binding arbitration.

Levy of tax 
Tax is levied at the tax rate and assessment ratio applicable for the year.  Taxing jurisdictions levy tax on property following a preliminary or final determination of value.  Property taxes in the United States generally are due only if the taxing jurisdiction has levied or billed the tax.  The form of levy or billing varies, but is often accomplished by mailing a tax bill to the property owner or mortgage company.

Exemptions and incentives 
Taxing jurisdictions provide a wide variety of methods a property owner may use to reduce tax.  Nearly all jurisdictions provide a homestead exemption reducing the taxable value, and thus tax, of an individual's home. Many provide additional exemptions for veterans.  Taxing jurisdictions may also offer temporary or permanent full or partial exemptions from property taxes, often as an incentive for a particular business to locate its premises within the jurisdiction.  Some jurisdictions provide broad exemptions from property taxes for businesses located within certain areas, such as enterprise zones.

Exemptions can be quite substantial. In New York City alone, an Independent Budget Office study found that religious institutions would have been taxed  yearly without such exemptions; all exempt groups avoided paying a combined  in the fiscal year of 2012 (1 July 2011 to 30 June 2012).

Payment 
Time and manner of payment of property taxes varies widely.  Property taxes in many jurisdictions are due in a single payment by January 1.  Many jurisdictions provide for payment in multiple installments. In some jurisdictions, the first installment payment is based on prior year tax.  Payment is generally required by cash or check delivered or mailed to the taxing jurisdiction.

Liens and seizures 
Property taxes generally attach to the property; that is, they become an encumbrance on the property which the current and future owners must satisfy.  This attachment, or lien, generally happens automatically without further action of the taxing authority.  The lien generally is removed automatically upon payment of the tax.

If the tax is not paid within a specified period of time (including additional interest, penalties, and costs), a tax sale is held, which may result in either 1) the actual sale of a property, or 2) a lien sold to a third party, who (after another specified period of time) may take action to claim the property, or force a later sale to redeem the lien.

Attachment date 
The tax lien attaches to the property at a specific date, generally the date the tax liability becomes enforceable.  This date, known as the attachment date, varies by state, and in some states by local jurisdiction.

Delinquency 
Where the property owner does not pay tax by the due date, the taxing authority may assess penalties and interest.  The amount, timing, and procedures vary widely.  Generally, the penalty and interest are enforceable in the same manner as the tax, and attach to the property.

Seizure and sale 
Where the property owner fails to pay tax, the taxing authority may act to enforce its lien. Enforcement procedures vary by state.  In some states, the lien may be sold by the taxing authority to a third party, who can then attempt collection.  In most states, the taxing authority can seize the property and offer it for sale, generally at a public auction.  In some states, rights acquired in such sale may be limited.

Tax administrations 
Property taxes are generally administered separately by each jurisdiction imposing property tax, though some jurisdictions may share a common property tax administration.  Often the administration of the taxes is conducted from the taxing jurisdiction's administrative offices (e.g., town hall).  The form and organization varies widely.

Assessors 
Most taxing jurisdictions refer to the official charged with determining property values, assessing, and collecting property taxes as assessors.  Assessors may be elected, appointed, hired, or contracted, depending on rules within the jurisdiction, which may vary within a state.  Assessors may or not be involved in collection of tax.  The tax assessors in some states are required to pass certain certification examinations and/or have a certain minimum level of property valuation experience.  Larger jurisdictions employ full-time personnel in the tax assessors office, while small jurisdictions may engage only one part-time person for the entire tax assessor function.

Constitutional limitations 
Property taxes, like all taxes in the United States, are subject to constraints under the United States and applicable state constitutions.  The United States Constitution contains three relevant provisions: limits on federal direct taxation, an equal protection rule, and the privileges and immunities provisions.  Nearly all state constitutions impose uniformity and equality rules.  Most state constitutions also impose other restrictions, which vary widely.

The federal government is generally prohibited from imposing direct taxes unless such taxes are then given to the states in proportion to population.  Thus, ad valorem property taxes have not been imposed at the federal level.

The states must grant residents of other states equal protections as taxpayers.

Uniformity and equality 
State constitutions constrain taxing authorities within the state, including local governments.  Typically, these constitutions require that property taxes be uniformly or equally assessed.  While many states allow differing rates of taxation among tax jurisdictions, most prohibit the same jurisdiction from applying different rates to different taxpayers. These provisions have generally been interpreted to mean the method of valuation and assessment must be consistent from one local government to another.  Some state courts have held that this uniformity and equality requirement does not prevent granting individualized tax credits (such as exemptions and incentives).  Some states permit different classes of property (as opposed to different classes of taxpayers) to be valued using different assessment ratios.  In many states the uniformity and equality provisions apply only to property taxes, leading to significant classification problems.

History 
Property taxes in the United States originated during colonial times.  By 1796, state and local governments in fourteen of the fifteen states taxed land, but only four taxed inventory (stock in trade).  Delaware did not tax property, but rather the income from it.  In some states, "all property, with a few exceptions, was taxed; in others, specific objects were named. Land was taxed in one state according to quantity, in another according to quality, and in a third not at all. Responsibility for the assessment and collection of taxes in some cases attached to the state itself; in others, to the counties or townships."  Vermont and North Carolina taxed land based on quantity, while New York and Rhode Island taxed land based on value.  Connecticut taxed land based on type of use.  Procedures varied widely.

During the period from 1796 until the Civil War, a unifying principle developed: "the taxation of all property, movable and immovable, visible and invisible, or real and personal, as we say in America, at one uniform rate."  During this period, property taxes came to be assessed based on value.  This was introduced as a requirement in many state constitutions.

After the Civil War, intangible property, including corporate stock, took on far greater importance. Taxing jurisdictions found it difficult to find and tax this sort of property.  This trend led to the introduction of alternatives to the property tax (such as income and sales taxes) at the state level.  Property taxes remained a major source of government revenue below the state level.

Hard times during the Great Depression led to high delinquency rates and reduced property tax revenues.  Also during the 1900s, many jurisdictions began exempting certain property from taxes.  Many jurisdictions exempted homes of war veterans. After World War II, some states replaced exemptions with "circuit breaker" provisions limiting increases in value for residences.

Various economic factors have led to taxpayer initiatives in various states to limit property tax.  California Proposition 13 (1978) amended the California Constitution to limit aggregate property taxes to 1% of the "full cash value of such property."  It also limited the increase in assessed value of real property to an inflation factor that was limited to 2% per year.

Policy issues

There are numerous policy issues regarding property tax, including:
 Fairness, or lack thereof
 Progressivity, or lack thereof
 Administrability/socialist redistribution of taxpayer funds
 Allodial title vs. true ownership of property
In spite of these issues, many aspects of the property tax, and the reliance of local governments on it as a principal source of revenue, have remained much the same since colonial times.

Opinions on property tax

Sprawl 
In the absence of urban planning policies, property tax on real estate changes the incentives for developing land, which in turn affects land use patterns. One of the main concerns is whether or not it encourages urban sprawl.

The market value of undeveloped real estate reflects a property's current use as well as its development potential. As a city expands, relatively cheap and undeveloped lands (such as farms, ranches, private conservation parks, etc.) increase in value as neighboring areas are developed into retail, industrial, or residential units. This raises the land value, which increases the property tax that must be paid on agricultural land, but does not increase the amount of revenue per land area available to the owner. This, along with a higher sale price, increases the incentive to rent or sell agricultural land to developers. On the other hand, a property owner who develops a parcel must thereafter pay a higher tax, based on the value of the improvements. This makes the development less attractive than it would otherwise be. Overall, these effects result in lower density development, which tends to increase sprawl.

Attempts to reduce the impact of property taxes on sprawl include:
 Land value taxation - This method separates the value of a given property into its actual components — land value and improvement value. A gradually lower and lower tax is levied on the improvement value and a higher tax is levied on the land value to insure revenue-neutrality. A similar method is known as split-rate taxation.
 Current-use valuation - This method assesses the value of a given property based only upon its current use. Much like land value taxation, this reduces the effect of city encroachment.
 Conservation easements - The property owner adds a restriction to the property prohibiting future development. This effectively removes the development potential as a factor in the property taxes.
 Exemptions - Exempting favored classes of real estate (such as farms, ranches, cemeteries or private conservation parks) from the property tax altogether or assessing their value at a minimal amount (for example, $1 per acre).
 Forcing higher density housing - In the Portland, Oregon area, for example, local municipalities are often forced to accept higher density housing with small lot sizes. This is governed by a multi-county development control board, in Portland's case Metro.
 Urban growth boundary or Green belt - Government declares some land undevelopable until a date in the future. This forces regional development back into the urban core, increasing density but also land and housing prices. It may also cause development to skip over the restricted-use zone, to occur in more distant areas, or to move to other cities.

Distributional 
Property tax has been shown to be regressive (that is, to fall disproportionately on those of lower income) under certain circumstances, because of its impact on particular low-income/high-asset groups such as pensioners and farmers. Because these persons have high-assets accumulated over time, they have a high property tax liability, although their realized income is low. Therefore, a larger proportion of their income goes to paying the tax. In areas with speculative land appreciation (such as California in the 1970s and 2000s), there may be little or no relationship between property taxes and a homeowner's ability to pay them short of selling the property.

This issue was a common argument used by supporters of such measures as California Proposition 13 or Oregon Ballot Measure 5; some economists have even called for the abolition of property taxes altogether, to be replaced by income taxes, consumption taxes such as Europe's VAT, or a combination of both. Others, however, have argued that property taxes are broadly progressive, since people of higher incomes are disproportionately likely to own more valuable property. In addition, while nearly all households have some income, nearly a third of households own no real estate. Moreover, the most valuable properties are owned by corporations not individuals. Hence, property is more unevenly distributed than income.

It has been suggested that these two beliefs are not incompatible — it is possible for a tax to be progressive in general but to be regressive in relation to minority groups. However, although not direct, and not likely one-to-one, property renters can be subject to property taxes as well. If the tax reduces the supply of housing units, then it will increase the rental price. In this way, the owner's cost of taxation is passed on to the renter (occupant).

Progressive policies 
As property increases in value the possibility exists that new buyers might pay taxes on outdated values thus placing an unfair burden on the rest of the property owners. To correct this imbalance municipalities periodically revalue property. Revaluation produces an up-to-date value to be used in determination of the tax rate necessary to produce the required tax levy.

A consequence of this is that existing owners are reassessed as well as new owners and thus are required to pay taxes on property the value of which is determined by market forces, such as gentrification in low income areas of a city. In an effort to relieve the frequently large tax burdens on existing owners, particularly those with fixed incomes such as the elderly and those who have lost their jobs, communities have introduced exemptions.

In some states, laws provide for exemptions (typically called homestead exemptions) and/or limits on the percentage increase in tax, which limit the yearly increase in property tax so that owner-occupants are not "taxed out of their homes". Generally, these exemptions and ceilings are available only to property owners who use their property as their principal residence. Homestead exemptions generally cannot be claimed on investment properties and second homes. When a homesteaded property changes ownership, the property tax often rises sharply and the property's sale price may become the basis for new exemptions and limits available to the new owner-occupant.

Homestead exemptions increase the complexity of property tax collection and sometimes provide an easy opportunity for people who own several properties to benefit from tax credits to which they are not entitled. Since there is no national database that links home ownership with Social Security numbers, landlords sometimes gain homestead tax credits by claiming multiple properties in different states, and even their own state, as their "principal residence", while only one property is truly their residence. In 2005, several US Senators and Congressmen were found to have erroneously claimed "second homes" in the greater Washington, D.C. area as their "principal residences", giving them property tax credits to which they were not entitled.

Undeserved homestead exemption credits became so ubiquitous in the state of Maryland that a law was passed in the 2007 legislative session to require validation of principal residence status through the use of a social security number matching system. The bill passed unanimously in the Maryland House of Delegates and Senate and was signed into law by the Governor. The fairness of property tax collection and distribution is a hotly debated topic. Some people feel school systems would be more uniform if the taxes were collected and distributed at a state level, thereby equalizing the funding of school districts. Others are reluctant to have a higher level of government determine the rates and allocations, preferring to leave the decisions to government levels closer to the people.

In Rhode Island efforts are being made to modify revaluation practices to preserve the major benefit of property taxation, the reliability of tax revenue, while providing for what some view as a correction of the unfair distribution of tax burdens on existing owners of property.

The Supreme Court has held that Congress can directly tax land ownership so long as the tax is apportioned among the states based upon representation/population. In an apportioned land tax, each state would have its own rate of taxation sufficient to raise its pro-rata share of the total revenue to be financed by a land tax. So, for example, if State A has 5% of the population, the State A would collect and remit to the federal government such tax revenue that equals 5% of the revenue sought. Such an apportioned tax on land had been used on many occasions up through the Civil War.

Indirect taxes on the transfer of land are permitted without apportionment: in the past, this has taken the form of requiring revenue stamps to be affixed to deeds and mortgages, but these are no longer required by federal law. Under the Internal Revenue Code, the government realizes a substantial amount of revenue from income taxes on capital gains from the sale of land and in estate taxes from the passage of property (including land) upon the death of its owner.

Milton Friedman noted that "[T]he property tax is one of the least bad taxes, because it's levied on something that cannot be produced — that part that is levied on the land". A 2008 analysis from the Organisation for Economic Co-operation and Development was consistent with Friedman's opinion; examining the effect of various types of taxes on economic growth, it found that property taxes "seem[ed] to be the most growth-friendly, followed by consumption taxes and then by personal income taxes."

See also
 Allodial title
 Council Tax, the UK equivalent of property tax
 Land patent
 Rates in the United Kingdom
 Teeter Plan
 Wealth Tax

References 

 How to protest for property taxes?

External links
Overview guides are provided by some states:
 Louisiana Property Tax Basics from Lafayette, Louisiana Tax Assessor's office
 Texas Property Tax Basics from Texas Comptroller of Public Accounts
 New York pamphlet How Property Tax Works
 The Illinois Property Tax System

Property law in the United States
Property taxes
Taxation in the United States